The sphenoethmoidal suture is the cranial suture between the sphenoid bone and the ethmoid bone.

It is located in the anterior cranial fossa.

External links

Bones of the head and neck
Cranial sutures
Human head and neck
Joints
Joints of the head and neck
Skeletal system
Skull